HD 23596 is a 7th magnitude star approximately 170 light years away in the constellation Perseus. The visual luminosity of the star is 2.63 times greater than the Sun. HD 23596 dwarfs the Sun is terms of physical properties; including mass, radius, age, metallicity, and temperature. The spectrum of the star is F8.

Planetary system 
In June 2002, a massive long-period planet orbiting the star was announced. In 2022, the inclination and true mass of HD 23596 b were measured via astrometry.

References

External links 
 
 

023596
017747
Perseus (constellation)
Planetary systems with one confirmed planet
F-type main-sequence stars
Durchmusterung objects